Paul Mathers (born 17 January 1970) is a Scottish professional footballer and coach. He is currently the goalkeeping coach at Scottish Premiership side St Johnstone, appointed in August 2015.

Career

Between 1986 and 1996, Mathers made 132 appearances for Dundee, before moving to Falkirk, where he played 91 times in three years. In 1999 , he moved to Linfield, making 63 appearances until a transfer back to Dundee in 2001. In his second stint at Dundee, which lasted for only one season, Mathers did not make a league appearance and was loaned out twice. He moved on in 2002 to Peterhead, where he made 164 league appearances.

Mathers signed with St Mirren in 2007. He did not make a first team appearance for St Mirren as he was employed primarily as a goalkeeping coach, but he continued to hold a playing registration. Mathers was an unused substitute for a 2-2 SPL draw at Inverness Caledonian Thistle on 29 March 2014, aged 44.

He moved to a coaching position with the Rangers academy on 6 August 2015. Later in August 2015, Mathers moved to a first team coaching position at St Johnstone.

Honours
Dundee 
1st division championship winners 1991/92

Falkirk

Scottish Challenge Cup (1): 1997

Linfield 

Irish Premier League (2): Champions 1999/2000, 2000/2001 
Irish League Cup (1): Winners 2000/2001

Greenock Morton

Scottish 2nd Division (1): Champions 2006/2007

References

External links

1970 births
Living people
Association football goalkeepers
Footballers from Aberdeen
Scottish footballers
Dundee F.C. players
Falkirk F.C. players
Linfield F.C. players
Peterhead F.C. players
Berwick Rangers F.C. players
Greenock Morton F.C. players
East Fife F.C. players
St Mirren F.C. players
Sligo Rovers F.C. players
Scottish Football League players
Scottish Premier League players
NIFL Premiership players
Rangers F.C. non-playing staff
St Johnstone F.C. non-playing staff